Lin Chuan (born 13 December 1951) is a Taiwanese economist and politician who served as Premier of the Republic of China (Taiwan) from 2016 to 2017 under President Tsai Ing-wen. He served as Minister of Budget, Accounting and Statistics and Minister of Finance during Chen Shui-bian's presidency.

Early life and education
Lin is of Mainland Chinese descent, and was born in Kaohsiung on 13 December 1951. He graduated from Fu Jen Catholic University with a bachelor's degree in economics in 1974, before earning a master's in public finance from National Chengchi University in 1978. Lin returned to the study of economics in the United States, obtaining his doctorate in the subject at the University of Illinois at Urbana–Champaign in 1984.

Career
He served as the Minister of the Directorate-General of Budget, Accounting and Statistics of the Executive Yuan from 2000 to 2002 and Minister of Finance from 2002 to 2006.

After stepping down as finance minister in 2006, Lin served on the board of multiple companies and led two think tanks. He also served within Taipei City Government as head of the city's .

Following Tsai Ing-wen's victory in the 2016 presidential election, Lin was selected as a co-convener of Tsai's transition team set up to manage the transfer of power from the outgoing Ma Ying-jeou administration. Soon after his appointment to the transition team, Lin became the subject of national media speculation linking him to several government posts within the Tsai administration. In February 2016, Lin was chosen to lead a task force that explored the possibility of joining the Trans-Pacific Partnership.

On 15 March 2016, president-elect Tsai named Lin premier. He was confirmed by the Legislative Yuan soon after and took office on 20 May 2016. On 4 September 2017 he resigned as premier reportedly to bolster Tsai's declining popularity. Shortly after stepping down, Lin was awarded the Order of Propitious Clouds.

On 15 January 2018, Lin Chuan took over the Chairman of TTY Biopharm Company Limited .

Personal life
Lin married Wu Pei-ling in September 2002 and has two daughters from a previous marriage.

References

1951 births
Living people
Fu Jen Catholic University alumni
National Chengchi University alumni
Academic staff of the National Chengchi University
Academic staff of the National Taiwan University
Politicians of the Republic of China on Taiwan from Kaohsiung
Premiers of the Republic of China on Taiwan
Taiwanese Ministers of Finance
University of Illinois Urbana-Champaign alumni
Recipients of the Order of Propitious Clouds